is a game and ONA franchise produced by Bandai Namco Group and Amuse. The premise of the project follows five aspiring male idols at a fictional talent agency. An anime television adaptation by BN Pictures began airing on TV Tokyo from October 2016 to December 2017.

Plot
Kanade Amamiya is a high school student, whiling hours away at his part-time job ever since he quit the soccer team. One day, Kanade is scouted by a famous idol producer. Kanade is not sure he wants to be an idol, and his new rival Junya Sasaki tells him that he doesn't have what it takes. After running through a rigorous day of idol exercises, Kanade realizes this just might be the passion he has been looking for.

Characters

DearDream

Kurofune

Media

Game
The Dream Festival! arcade game from Bandai began appearing in Japanese arcades from October 2012 as part of its Data Carddass line. A Mobile game, Dream Festival R, was released for the iOS and Android on May 25, 2016, and ended service on May 1, 2018.

Anime
An anime television series produced by Bandai Namco Pictures began airing on Tokyo MX from October to December 2016. A second season, titled Dream Festival! R, began airing from October to December 2017. Animate TV and Crunchyroll began streaming the series from September 23, 2016.

References

External links
 

2016 video games
Android (operating system) games
IOS games
Japan-exclusive video games
Japanese idol video games
Japanese idols in anime and manga
Music video games
Video games developed in Japan
Video games set in Japan